Pelochyta nigrescens is a moth of the family Erebidae. It was described by Paul Dognin in 1891. It is found in Ecuador, Bolivia and Peru.

References

Pelochyta
Moths described in 1891